Karl-Heinz Handschuh (born 30 November 1947) is a German former professional footballer who played as a midfielder or striker. He spent 14 seasons in the Bundesliga with VfB Stuttgart and Eintracht Braunschweig.

His son Steffen Handschuh appeared for VfB Stuttgart as well.

References

External links
 

1947 births
Living people
Association football midfielders
German footballers
Germany B international footballers
VfB Stuttgart players
Eintracht Braunschweig players
Bundesliga players
People from Esslingen (district)
Sportspeople from Stuttgart (region)
Footballers from Baden-Württemberg
West German footballers